The McIntyre system, or systems as there have been five of them, is a playoff system that gives an advantage to teams or competitors qualifying higher. The systems were developed by Ken McIntyre, an Australian lawyer, historian and English lecturer, for the Victorian Football League in 1931.

In the VFL/AFL 
The first McIntyre system, the Page–McIntyre system, also known as the McIntyre final four system, was adopted by the VFL in 1931, after using three systems since its foundation in 1897, the major system and predecessor to the Page–McIntyre system being the "amended Argus system" that had operated from 1907 to 1923 and 1925 to 1930.

McIntyre also devised the McIntyre final five system for the VFL for 1972, the McIntyre final six system for 1991 (which was revised for 1992) and the McIntyre final eight system for the 1994 season.

The AFL and its fans grew dissatisfied with some of the outcomes the McIntyre final eight system might allow, and replaced it with another final eight system in 2000.

Other competitions 
McIntyre finals systems are used prominently throughout Australia. Most Australian rules football leagues, from professional down to suburban, use a McIntyre finals system. The New South Wales Rugby League/National Rugby League has used the McIntyre final four and final five at different times throughout its history, and used the McIntyre final eight system from 1999 until 2011. The Page–McIntyre system is also used in the ANZ Championships (netball), the Australian Baseball League and Women's National Basketball League. It was also used in the A-League (soccer) before that competition expanded its finals series to a top-six format. It is also used in the Indian Premier League (cricket).

Under the name Page playoff system, the McIntyre final four is commonly used in softball and curling events, especially in Canada. The system was also used in the Rugby League National League Three in Great Britain for the 2004 season.

A hybrid version the Page–McIntyre system has been in used the Big Bash League in Australia since the 2019-2020 season, the difference between the original version and the hybrid version is a fifth game is played between 4th and 5th placed team playing in a elimination final with the winner playing 3rd in the first semi-final, a game that is usually played between 3rd and 4th in the original version of the system.  

In North America, since 2021, it has been used as the preliminary round of the NBA Playoffs as a 'play-in tournament' to determine the seventh and eighth seeds for the main playoff tournament, with seeds 7 and 8 playing, then seeds 9 and 10, with the winner of the 7/8 game being the seventh seed, and the loser of the 7/8 game and winner of the 9/10 game competing for the eighth seed.

The systems

Page–McIntyre system 

The Page–McIntyre system features four teams. In the first round of the Page–McIntyre system, the highest two ranked teams play each other, with the winner going straight through to the grand final and the loser going through to the preliminary final. The lowest two ranked teams play each other, and the winner advances to the preliminary final. The winner of preliminary final gets through to the grand final. In this system, the top two teams are able to lose a match and still qualify for the grand final, this is referred to as a 'double chance'.

Assuming that each team has an even chance of winning each match, the probability for both the highest ranked teams winning the competition is 37.5%, compared to 12.5% for the third and fourth placed teams.

McIntyre final five system 

As its name states, the McIntyre final five system features five teams. From the second round the McIntyre final five system is the same as the Page–McIntyre system; however, in the first round the lowest two ranked teams play to eliminate one team and the second and third ranked teams determine which match they will play in the second round. The highest ranked team has a bye in the first round.

In this case, if all teams have an even chance of winning each match, the highest ranked team has a 37.5% chance, ranks two and three have a 25% chance and the lowest two ranked teams have a 6.25% chance of winning the competition.

First McIntyre final six system 

The first McIntyre final six system was also the same as the Page–McIntyre system from the second round. In this case, two of the four lowest ranked teams are eliminated in the first round, while the top two determine which match they will play in the second round. Under this system the top two teams receive a double chance, as does the winner of match B.

Second McIntyre final six system 

This adaptation of the first McIntyre system corrected for the anomaly that, in the first week, the team who finished 4th would have a more difficult opponent than the team who finished 5th, and was hence more likely to be eliminated, despite finishing higher. This was achieved by adding flexibility to the second round draw, so that the two elimination final winners were re-ranked to determine which played the winner of the qualifying final and which played the loser.

However, both McIntyre final six systems had another weakness: the loser of the qualifying final (which is the most difficult game of the first round), ended up facing elimination in the first semi-final, while the higher-ranked elimination final winner (who has had the easiest game of the first round) has a double chance in the second semi-final.

McIntyre final eight system 

The McIntyre final eight bears little in common with the other McIntyre systems. At no stage does it follow the Page–McIntyre structure, and at no stage after the first week does any team retain a double chance. The system allows for 26 of the 28 combinations of the eight finalists to feature in the grand final (the two combinations not possible are 1st v 7th and 2nd v 8th). It gives 18.75% to 1st and 2nd, 15.625% to 3rd, 12.5% to 4th and 5th, 9.375% to 6th and 6.25% to 7th and 8th.

See also 
 NRL finals system
 AFL finals series
 Top five play-offs
 Top six play-offs
 McIntyre final eight system
 AFL final eight system, adopted by the AFL to address perceived problems in the McIntyre final eight
 Super League play-offs, which once used a similar system with its own unique twist
 NBA Play-In Tournament, which used a similar system since 2021

References

External links 
Grand Finals at the MCG Contains a brief summary of the finals systems used in the VFL/AFL

Rugby league terminology
Australian rules football terminology
Tournament systems
History of Australian rules football